The Han Zhao (304–329 AD), or Former Zhao, was a dynastic state of China ruled by the Xiongnu people during the Sixteen Kingdoms period of Chinese history. In Chinese historiography, it was given two conditional state titles, the Northern Han for the state proclaimed in 304 by Liu Yuan, and the Former Zhao for the state proclaimed in 319 by Liu Yao. The reference to them as separate states should be considered misleading, given that when Liu Yao changed the name of the state from "Han" to "Zhao" in 319, he treated the state as having been continuous from the time that Liu Yuan founded it in 304; instead, he de-established his imperial lineage from the Han dynasty and claimed ancestry directly from Yu the Great of the Xia dynasty.

The reason it was also referred to as "Former Zhao" in historiography is that when the powerful general Shi Le broke away and formed his own dynasty in 319, the new regime by Shi Le was also officially named "Zhao" as well, thus in Chinese historiography Shi Le's state is referred to as the "Later Zhao". Since both the Former Zhao and Northern Han were ruled by the same family, the Chinese scholars often conditionally combined them into a single Han Zhao regime. Numerous Western texts refer to the two states separately; others referred to the Han state as the "Northern Han", a confusing nomenclature as the term also refers to the Northern Han in the later Five Dynasties and Ten Kingdoms period.

All rulers of the Han Zhao were titled emperors. Han Zhao rulers were all extremely intelligent and articulate, but some lacked self-control and demonstrated excessive cruelty on the battlefield. Particularly typical of this pattern of behavior was Liu Cong (Emperor Zhaowu), who was clearly able to discern good strategic plans from bad. He would sometimes indulge himself on wine and women, and his patterns of erratic behavior often resulted in deaths of honest officials.  Han Zhao was considered to be a state that never fully realized its potential, it had a right mix of talent among its officials, and its armies were extremely powerful especially when utilized properly, but it would not always complete the conquests that its emperors envisioned, and eventually fell to its formal general Shi Le.

The Han Zhao armies sacked the Jin dynastic capitals of Luoyang in 311 and Chang'an in 316. Emperor Huai and Emperor Min of the Jin were captured, humiliated and executed. Remnants of the Jin court fled to Jiankang, located east of Luoyang and Chang'an, where the Emperor Yuan founded the Eastern Jin dynasty.

In 318, Liu Can and the imperial Liu clan at Pingyang were toppled and executed by the coup d'etat of Jin Zhun, who was in turn overthrown by Shi Le and Liu Yao. Liu Yao, as an imperial prince, claimed the throne and changed the dynastic name from "Han" to "Zhao". The Han Zhao dynasty lasted until 329, when Shi Le defeated Liu Yao at the Luo River. Liu Yao was captured and executed. His sons were executed a year later.

History

By the 280s, a huge number (approximately 400,000) of Xiongnu herdsmen resided in the Ordos Desert and Bing, a political division including modern-day areas of the whole Shanxi province, southwestern part of Inner Mongolia and eastern part of Shaanxi province, after Cao Cao moved them there and split them into "five departments" (五部, pinyin Wǔbù). The Southern Xiongnu continued their nomadic lifestyles of the steppes with horse breeding and to some extent agriculture. In spite of significant loss of Chinese sedentary population, the Chinese portion of the population in the state is estimated to be around 1,500,000. In addition to the Southern Xiongnu nomads, the state numbered 1,000,000 of other nomadic tribes, mainly Jie, Xianbei, Di, and Qiang, for a total of approximately 1,400,000 nomadic population, or 200 thousand yurts.

The position of the Chinese farmers changed drastically, the accent of economic production shifted from grain agriculture to animal husbandry, much of the arable land was converted to pastures, huge tracts of land were reserved for traditional encircling hunts, and abuse and exploitation of the nomadic "aliens" had stopped. In addition, endless wars needed vast supplies of materials and people, and the brunt of the wars fell heavily on the Chinese farmers, who had to report to the assembly points fully equipped with arms, provisions, and draft wagons, following the regulations applied to the nomadic forces. In 340, Shi Jilong set the target number of troops and materials at 500 thousand troops, 10 thousand ships, 11 million hu of grain and beans, and about half of the farm draft animals were requisitioned. Shi Jilong also promulgated a ban on keeping farm horses, over 40,000 horses were confiscated, along with over 20,000 oxen.

In accordance with Jin-shu,  the Southern Xiongnu were organized into 19 pastoral rout communities, one of which was a tribe Qianqui (Qiang Qu), and another was their offshoot Jie.

Sinicization was evident, especially among the elite; Liu Yuan, a head of the Left Wing (左部, pinyin Zuǒbù), a hereditary position of the successor to the throne, was educated at Luoyang, a capital of the Jin Dynasty, and was proficient in Chinese literature, history, military strategies and tactics, he had an expertise of a perfect person in the classical sense. Speculations had recounted that Liu Yuan was once considered the post of the Jin forces commander for the conquest of the Kingdom of Wu; that consideration was later dropped because of his Xiongnu ethnicity.

Nonetheless, among the Xiongnu elite and herdsmen, including Liu Yuan himself, a keen sense of separate identity from the Chinese was retained. Most herdsmen still kept their horseback raiding and combat skills. Discontent against the Jin dynastic rule and of their subordinate position prompted them to seek an independent or self-governing Xiongnu entity. As one of the elite adequately put it, "since the fall of Han Dynasty, the Kingdom of Wei and the Jin dynasty have risen one after the other. Although our Xiongnu king (Shanyu) had been given a nominal hereditary title, he no longer has a single foothold of sovereign territory."

Developments in the War of the Eight Princes (also known as the Rebellion of the Eight Kings) finally favored the Xiongnu. The Xiongnu leader Liu Xuan, a relative of Liu Yuan, said that the Xiongnu people were treated like slaves under the Han Chinese Western Jin masters but now that the Han Chinese Western Jin were in a civil war killing each other, it was time for the Xiongnu to revolt and take revenge.  Liu Yuan took advantage of a commission from the desperate Prince of Chengdu (Sima Ying), who was just being driven out of his base at Ye (near modern-day Linzhang County ch. 临漳县, Hebei province) to gather 50,000 Xiongnu warriors. Liu Yuan then proceeded to proclaim himself the "King of Han," the same title used centuries ago by Liu Bang (later Emperor Gao of Han and the founder of Han Dynasty) – a deliberate adoption of the long fallen Han Dynasty based on the earlier intermarriages of Xiongnu shanyu and Han princesses to render the Jin and Wei usurpers. Liu fully wished that such legitimist stance would earn him substantial support from the Chinese elite. His motives also explained the extent of his adoption of the ideology and political practices from the same elite.

Nevertheless, such proclamation was to remain titular – his war effort would eventually outdo his legitimist plan. His Han state attracted the support of some chieftains of other non-Chinese Xianbei and Di and certain bandit forces including those of an ex-slave Shi Le of the Jie ethnicity. Shi Le was a slave of Han Chinese official who was humiliated and forced to wear a cangue on his neck. However the neighboring Tuoba tribe, the powerful Xianbei nomads in modern-day Inner Mongolia and northern parts of Shanxi province, intruded into the Xiongnu residence of the Han State under their chieftain Tuoba Yilu (拓拔猗盧, pinyin Tuòbá Yīlú). A powerful Xiongnu state would dash Tuoba's hope of migrating into the region.

On one hand the Tuoba would hence assist the Jin governor of Bing to launch counteroffensive against the Han state. On the other hand, Xiongnu cavalry, successful in plundering the countryside, failed to capture the fortified Jinyang (modern-day Taiyuan city, the provincial capital of the Shanxi province), the provincial capital of Bing even though the former governor Sima Teng had fled to the North China Plain and left a mess. Liu Kun, the new governor, reorganized the defense and exploited the feud between the Han and the Tuoba to his advantage. His biography is in Jinshu 62. Allegiance between the Jin court and the Tuoba was sealed – five prefectures were rewarded in 310 to Tuoba Yilu, who was also made the Duke (later on Prince) of Dai. The areas around Jinyang would remain in Jin hands until the death of Tuoba Yilu in 316 when Jinyang was captured after a disastrous counteroffensive. Liu Kun fled but was later murdered by a Xianbei chieftain Duan Pidi.

By 309, The Xiongnu armies defeated the Jin armies on the field and pushed all the way up to the gates of Luoyang.

The Buluoji who lived during the Sui dynasty and Tang dynasty were believed to be descendants of Southern Xiongnu. Scholars such as Sanping Chen have noted analogous groups in Inner Asia, with phonologically similar names, who were frequently described in similar terms: during the 4th century, the Buluoji (Middle Chinese b'uo-lak-kiei), a component of the "Five Barbarian" groups in Ancient China, were portrayed as both a "mixed race" (zahu) and "troublemakers". Peter A. Boodberg noted that the Buluoji in the Chinese sources were recorded as remnants of the Xiongnu confederation.

Rulers of the Han Zhao

Note: Liu Xi was Liu Yao's crown prince who was thrust into the leadership role when Liu Yao was captured by Later Zhao's emperor Shi Le, but he never took the imperial title.

Rulers' family tree

See also
Xiongnu

References 

 
Dynasties in Chinese history
Former countries in Chinese history
History of Mongolia
Xiongnu
304 establishments
4th-century establishments in China
329 disestablishments